Auguste Élisabeth Joseph Bon-Amour de Talhouët-Roy, marquis de Talhouët (11 October 1819, Paris - 11 May 1884, château du Lude, Sarthe) was a French politician. He was deputy for Sarthe from 1849 to 1876 and senator for Sarthe from 1876 to 1882. He also served as minister for public works in Émile Ollivier's cabinet from 2 January to 15 May 1870.

Sources
http://www.assemblee-nationale.fr/sycomore/fiche.asp?num_dept=8778

1819 births
1884 deaths
Politicians from Paris
French Ministers of Public Works
Members of the National Legislative Assembly of the French Second Republic
Members of the 1st Corps législatif of the Second French Empire
Members of the 2nd Corps législatif of the Second French Empire
Members of the 3rd Corps législatif of the Second French Empire
Members of the 4th Corps législatif of the Second French Empire
Members of the National Assembly (1871)
French Senators of the Third Republic
Senators of Sarthe
Chevaliers of the Légion d'honneur